The 2015–16 season (officially known as Liga de Plata and also as Torneo Luis Baltazar Ramírez) will be El Salvador's Segunda División de Fútbol Salvadoreño The season will be split into two championships Apertura 2015 and Clausura 2016. The champions of the Apertura and Clausura play the direct promotion playoff every year. The winner of that series ascends to Primera División de Fútbol de El Salvador.

Team information
A total of 23 teams will contest the league, including  sides from the 2014–15 Segunda División and 3 promoted from the Tercera Division.

with the increase of 4 teams from the previous edition, teams from lower level could apply to join the league and would be judged based on facility, fans, locations and if they purchase a 10,000 or 15, 000 dollars license

Changes from the 2014-2015 seasons
Teams promoted to Primera División de Fútbol Profesional - Apertura 2015
 Real Destroyer (However sold their spot to Sonsonate and will return to Segunda Division)

Teams relegated to Segunda División de Fútbol Salvadoreño  - Apertura 2015
 None

Teams relegated to Tercera División de Fútbol Profesional - Apertura 2015
 C.D. Liberal

Teams promoted from Tercera Division De Fútbol Profesional - Apertura 2015
 Fuerte San Francisco

New Teams or teams that purchased a spot in the Segunda division
 Leones de Occidente (Bought their spot from Guadalupano)
 C.D. Brasilia (Originally relegated from the tercera division, however they purchased a spot in the segunda division)
 Toros F.C. (Bought their spot from Atletico Marte)
 Independiente F.C. (El Salvador) (purchased a spot in the segunda division)
 EF San Pablo Tacachico (purchased a spot in the segunda division)
 Atlético Apopa (purchased a spot in the segunda division)
 FC San Rafael Cedros (Bought their spot from Turin FESA)
 Quequeisque (Bought their spot from Real Destroyer)

Teams that failed to register for the Apertura 2015
 C.D. Chalatenango (Purchased a spot in the primera division  and didn't sell or create a team to fill the spot)
 Atletico Marte (originally relegated from the primera division, however they purchased a spot in the primera division)
 C.D. Guadalupano (Sold their spot to Leones de Metapan) 
 Sonsonate (Purchased the spot of Real Destroyer in the primera division)
 Turin FESA (Sold their spot to San Rafael Cedros)
 Real Destroyer (sold and dissolved to join Quequeispeque)

Stadia and locations

The following 23 clubs will compete in the Segunda División de Fútbol Salvadoreño during the 2015-2016 season:

Apertura

Personnel and sponsoring

Grupo Centro Occidente

Grupo Centro Oriente

Final Series

Apertura

Finals

First leg

Second leg

Municipal Limeno won 4-2 on aggregate.

Individual awards

Clausura

Personnel and sponsoring

Managerial changes

Before the start of the season

During the Apertura season

Grupo Centro Occidente

Grupo Centro Oriente

Final Series

Cláusura

Finals

First leg

Second leg

Municipal Limeno won 5-4 on penalties, aggregate tied 3-3.

Individual awards

Aggregate table

Grupo Centro-Occidente

Grupo Centro-Oriente

References

External links
 https://archive.today/20130807152309/http://www.futbolsv.com/category/segunda-division/
 http://www.culebritamacheteada.com.sv/category/nacional/segunda-division-nacional/ 
 http://www.edhdeportes.com/futbol-nacional/segunda-division/

Segunda División de Fútbol Salvadoreño seasons
2015–16 in Salvadoran football
EL Sal